James Gregory Vaughan Jr. (born June 15, 1973) is an American actor and former fashion model, known for his on and off appearances in roles on the soap operas The Young and the Restless (2002–03), General Hospital (2003–09), and Days of Our Lives (2012–21). Vaughan also starred as Dan Gordon on the second season of the supernatural series Charmed (1999-2000). In 2016, Vaughan began starring in the Oprah Winfrey Network drama series Queen Sugar as Detective Calvin.

Career
The actor and former male fashion model has starred in soap operas such as The Young and the Restless and General Hospital. To date, his best-known role is that of Lucky Spencer in the latter, which he played from 2003 to 2009.

At age 16, while getting a haircut, he learned of a "Back to School" modeling competition, and sent in some snapshots. He was selected as a finalist but did not win. However, the winner encouraged Vaughan to pursue modeling, and Vaughan signed up with a modeling agency.

Shortly after graduating from Mesquite High School, he was invited to Milan, Italy, where he modeled for designer Giorgio Armani for two and a half months. More campaigns followed, with designers such as Gianni Versace, Tommy Hilfiger, Banana Republic, and Ralph Lauren.

While modeling in Miami, Vaughan started to become dissatisfied with the modeling life, and decided to relocate to pursue his dream of becoming an actor, he then moved to Los Angeles. His first role was on Baywatch, as well as on the pilot for a 1996 Aaron Spelling series, Malibu Shores, that lead to his future appearances on Beverly Hills, 90210 and was a cast regular for the second season of Charmed.

His next major role was from 2002 to 2003 as Diego Guittierez in the daytime drama The Young and the Restless. When the character was written off the show, Vaughan got a call from the producers of General Hospital, who were seeking a new actor for the character of Lucky Spencer, son of the famous soap opera couple Luke and Laura. Vaughan was the first actor to portray Lucky as a full-fledged adult, with the part having been played by Jonathan Jackson and Jacob Young.

On June 7, 2006, Vaughan won the role of the new spokesperson for I Can't Believe It's Not Butter in a ceremony in New York. The contest was created to replace Fabio.

In 2007, Vaughan appeared on The Tyra Banks Show to help Tyra Banks through "soap opera school."

On September 28, 2009, Vaughan announced that he would exit the role of Lucky Spencer on General Hospital; he last aired on October 20, with original portrayer Jonathan Jackson re-assuming the role on October 27.

In the July 16, 2012 edition of Soap Opera Digest, it was announced that Vaughan would join the NBC soap opera Days of Our Lives as Eric Brady, who was ordained as a priest before returning to Salem. He first aired on November 13.

In July 2013, Vaughan appeared in "Second Chances", a Hallmark Original Movie, alongside Days co-star Alison Sweeney. The movie was filmed before Sweeney and Vaughn became siblings on Days of Our Lives.

Personal life
Vaughan married Dutch model and actress Touriya Haoud on June 4, 2006. The couple has three sons. During their marriage, they lived in Los Angeles, California and Charlotte, North Carolina. On April 14, 2014, Haoud and Vaughan announced their separation. Their children live with Vaughan in the United States and Haoud moved back to the Netherlands following their divorce.

On December 26, 2019, Vaughan announced his engagement to actress Angie Harmon.

Filmography

Awards and nominations

References

External links
 

20th-century American male actors
21st-century American male actors
American male film actors
Male models from Texas
American male soap opera actors
Daytime Emmy Award winners
Daytime Emmy Award for Outstanding Supporting Actor in a Drama Series winners
Living people
Male actors from Dallas
Mesquite High School (Texas) alumni
1973 births